Alexander Dwight Foster (born August 26, 1984) is a retired American professional ice hockey forward who last played with the Brampton Beast of the ECHL.

He is the son of former NHL player Dwight Foster and nephew of former NHL player Wes Jarvis. Prior to advancing to the professional ranks, Foster played both junior hockey and college hockey. He played his collegiate hockey at Bowling Green State University. After leaving college in 2006, he was signed to the Toronto Maple Leafs organization. He played for their farm team, the Toronto Marlies, occasionally being called into action for the NHL team, the Toronto Maple Leafs.

Early life
Foster was born August 26, 1984, in Canton, Michigan, to parents Dwight and Maryann Foster. He has two brothers and one sister. His father, Dwight is a former NHL player who played for the Boston Bruins, Colorado Rockies, New Jersey Devils and Detroit Red Wings during his 10 seasons in the major league. His uncle, Wes Jarvis, also played in the NHL for the Washington Capitals, Minnesota North Stars, Los Angeles Kings and Toronto Maple Leafs.

As a youth, Foster played in the 1998 Quebec International Pee-Wee Hockey Tournament with the Detroit Compuware minor ice hockey team. He graduated from Salem High School in 2002.

Playing career

Amateur
Foster played junior hockey in the USHL for three seasons. He played the 2001–02 and 2002–03 seasons with the Sioux Falls Stampede, and 2002–03 and 2003-04 seasons with the Danville Wings. In his time with the Wings, he helped lead them to the final four of the USHL playoffs.

Foster joined the Bowling Green Falcons ice hockey team in 2004. During his time at Bowling Green, Foster amassed 82 points in 72 games and ranks 10th all-time at BGSU in assists-per-game, averaging .875. In his freshman season (2004–05) he was named CCHA Rookie of the Week on January 9, 2005. He finished the season as the ninth-highest scoring freshman in the conference.

In his sophomore (2005–06) season, Foster tallied 51 points in 38 games. He was named CCHA Player of the Month for November 2005, Offensive Player of the Week on November 7, 2005 and was a Hobey Baker Award candidate.

Professional
Foster was signed as a free agent by the Toronto Maple Leafs on March 8, 2006. His contract included the maximum possible signing bonus, which was approximately US$170,000. Foster was assigned to Toronto's AHL minors team, the Toronto Marlies the next day. In his rookie (2005–06) season with the Marlies, Foster scored one goal in eight games. On October 16, 2006, Foster was reassigned to the Columbia Inferno of the ECHL, later to be recalled to the Toronto Marlies (AHL) on November 11, 2006. Foster re-signed with the Toronto Marlies on July 18, 2007, with a one-year contract.

On February 24, 2008, Foster established a Toronto Marlies single season record for short-handed goals when he scored his fifth short-handed goal of the season against the Hamilton Bulldogs.

On March 17, 2008, Foster was called up to the Toronto Maple Leafs and made his NHL debut the following night against the New York Islanders, wearing jersey #32. He would appear in three games before being reassigned to the Toronto Marlies on March 26, 2008. In his three games he totaled one shot, no points, and no penalty minutes.

On October 22, 2010, Foster was named the third captain in Toronto Marlies history.

On June 7, 2011, after spending his 6th professional season within the Maple Leafs organization, Foster left as a free agent and signed a one-year contract with European team, HC Sparta Praha of the Czech Extraliga. He spent the 2012–13 season split between HC Sparta Praha of the Czech Extraliga and Adler Mannheim of the Deutsche Eishockey Liga.

On June 20, 2013, Foster opted to remain in Germany to sign a one-year contract with the Iserlohn Roosters of the DEL.

After six years abroad playing across Europe, Foster returned to the United States as a free agent following the 2016–17 season with the Belfast Giants of the Elite Ice Hockey League. On September 22, 2017, he agreed to a one-year ECHL contract with the Toledo Walleye. Prior to playing in the 2017–18 season, Foster was released from his contract with the Walleye and later signed by fellow ECHL club, the Rapid City Rush, on October 17, 2017. After opening the season with 5 games for the Rush, Foster was traded to the Brampton Beast on November 11, 2017.

Career statistics

Awards and honors

References

External links

 
 
 Alex Foster biography at BGSU Falcons official Site

1984 births
Adler Mannheim players
American men's ice hockey centers
Belfast Giants players
Bolzano HC players
Bowling Green Falcons men's ice hockey players
Brampton Beast players
Columbia Inferno players
Danville Wings (USHL) players
HC Sparta Praha players
Ice hockey players from Michigan
Iserlohn Roosters players
Living people
People from Canton, Michigan
Rapid City Rush players
Sioux Falls Stampede players
Toronto Maple Leafs players
Toronto Marlies players
Undrafted National Hockey League players
American sportspeople of Canadian descent
American expatriate ice hockey players in Canada
American expatriate ice hockey players in the Czech Republic
American expatriate ice hockey players in Germany
American expatriate ice hockey players in Italy
American expatriate ice hockey players in Northern Ireland